The 2013 Oregon State Beavers baseball team represents Oregon State University in the 2013 NCAA Division I baseball season.  The Beavers play their home games at Goss Stadium at Coleman Field and are members of the Pac-12 Conference.  The team is coached by Pat Casey in his 19th season at Oregon State.  The Beavers won the Pac-12 conference with a 24-6 conference record, and made it to the semifinals of the College World Series in Omaha, Nebraska, officially finishing tied for 3rd in the tournament.

Roster

Coaches

Schedule

Ranking movements

References

Oregon State Beavers baseball seasons
Oregon State
Pac-12 Conference baseball champion seasons
College World Series seasons
2013 in sports in Oregon
Oregon State